Radiant Child may refer to

Jean-Michel Basquiat: The Radiant Child, a 2010 documentary film
Radiant Child: The Story of Young Artist Jean-Michel Basquiat, a 2016 biography